Kevin Anthony Lisbie (born 17 October 1978) is a former professional footballer who played as a striker. Born in London, he earned ten international caps for Jamaica. He is now a coach at Leyton Orient.

Club career

Charlton Athletic
Born in Hackney, London, to Jamaican parents, Lisbie made his professional debut for Charlton Athletic during the 1996–97 season.

He joined Queens Park Rangers on a month-long loan in December 2000. He was placed on the transfer list by Charlton in February 2002, but eventually signed a new two year-deal with Charlton in May. Reading had been tracking Lisbie, but ended their interest in late 2003, although Reading manager Alan Pardew said he would wait until Lisbie's contract with Charlton would come to an end. Possibly his best moment in a Charlton shirt was a hat-trick against Liverpool in a 3–2 win over the Merseyside club in September 2003. Lisbie signed a new three-year deal with Charlton in June 2004. He was a regular for Charlton during the 2004–05 season, until he started suffering from a series of nosebleeds, which revealed a benign tumour in the back of his nose, which was treated over the summer of 2005.

Lisbie made a month-long loan move to Norwich City in September 2005 and was recalled by Charlton in October. Later that season, in February 2006, he spent a month on loan at Derby County as the club tried to resolve an injury crisis. Lisbie was ruled out for three months with a shoulder injury in October 2006, and returned for Charlton's game against Bolton Wanderers in January 2007.

Lisbie was released by Charlton in July of that year after struggling to break into the first team. Several loan spells away from the club made it clear that his future lay elsewhere.

Colchester United
In August 2007, following a successful trial period, Lisbie joined Colchester United. Over the season he scored 17 goals and finished the club's top scorer, but could not prevent Colchester's relegation from the Championship. Colchester, trying to fend off interest in Lisbie from their East Anglian rivals Ipswich Town, offered him a new contract. However, Ipswich triggered a release clause in Lisbie's contract and the transfer was agreed between the two clubs.

Ipswich Town
Lisbie signed a three-year deal with Ipswich Town for fee of £600,000 in July 2008. Despite a promising start to his Ipswich career, he struggled to hold down a regular first-team spot.

He was released from his contract at Ipswich Town in May 2011.

Loan to Colchester United
In August 2009, Lisbie rejoined Colchester United, now playing in League One, on a season-long loan deal. He scored a brace in his second debut for the club in a 7–1 victory against Colchester's recently relegated rivals Norwich City. Lisbie finished as the club's top scorer again with 13 goals as the club finished eighth in League One.

Loan to Millwall
Lisbie was quickly signed on another season-long loan deal, this time by Kenny Jackett's Millwall side after they secured a return to the Championship in 2010. Lisbie's season was blighted by injury and finished that particular season with four goals in 19 appearances.

Leyton Orient
Lisbie signed on a free transfer for League One side Leyton Orient on a four-month contract, on 9 September 2011.

During the 2013 January transfer window, Orient accepted an offer from Sheffield United for Lisbie, but the striker turned down talks with the Blades. Orient immediately offered Lisbie a new 18-month contract which he signed on 4 February 2013. He was named as the club's player of the season for 2012–13.

On 4 March 2014, Lisbie signed a new one-year contract extension with Orient.

After a very successful period at Orient, Lisbie suffered a shoulder injury which ruled him out of the first team for much of the early part of the 2014–15 season. On his return, he found it difficult to re-establish his place among several other strikers at the club. On 17 March 2015, he signed on a month's loan with League Two Stevenage with his contract expiring at the end of the season.

Later career
Lisbie signed for Barnet on 29 May 2015. Following injury problems, he played just four times for the Bees, all as substitute, before leaving the club on 11 January 2016 in search of first-team football, having fallen behind John Akinde, Aaron McLean and Michael Gash in the pecking order. Shortly after his release Lisbie went back to his old club Leyton Orient on trial and played in a reserve game against Southend United.

He continued to keep fit by training with Orient while looking for another club and in January 2017 signed for National League South side Whitehawk. Lisbie scored within four minutes of his full Whitehawk debut in a 3–1 defeat at Crawley Town in the Sussex Senior Cup on 10 January 2017, but left the club the following month after only three substitute appearances; two in the league, and one in the FA Trophy.

Before the 2017–18 season started, Lisbie played and scored in a friendly game for Grays Athletic against Southend Manor. In October 2017 he joined Cray Valley Paper Mills. Lisbie spent two seasons with Cray before retiring after playing in the 2019 FA Vase Final. Lisbie returned for Cray in an FA Trophy match in October 2019. In 2022 he joined VCD Athletic.

International career
Lisbie was capped ten times by Jamaica between 2002 and 2004. He made his debut in a 5–0 friendly defeat against the United States. Lisbie scored twice for Jamaica, both goals coming in 2003, in friendlies against Australia and El Salvador.

Career statistics

Club

International

Scores and results list Jamaica's goal tally first, score column indicates score after each Lisbie goal.

|+ List of international goals scored by Kevin Lisbie
|-
| style="text-align:center"|1 || 7 September 2003 || Madejski Stadium, Reading, England ||  || style="text-align:center"|1–1 || style="text-align:center"|1–2 || Friendly || 
|-
| style="text-align:center"|2 || 16 November 2003 || The National Stadium, Kingston, Jamaica ||  || style="text-align:center"|2–0 || style="text-align:center"|3–0 || Friendly || 
|}

Honours
Individual
Football League One Player of the Month: November 2012
Leyton Orient Player of the Season: 2012–13

References

External links

1978 births
Footballers from the London Borough of Hackney
Living people
English footballers
Jamaican footballers
English people of Jamaican descent
Jamaica international footballers
Association football forwards
Charlton Athletic F.C. players
Gillingham F.C. players
Reading F.C. players
Queens Park Rangers F.C. players
Norwich City F.C. players
Derby County F.C. players
Colchester United F.C. players
Ipswich Town F.C. players
Millwall F.C. players
Leyton Orient F.C. players
Stevenage F.C. players
Barnet F.C. players
Whitehawk F.C. players
Cray Valley Paper Mills F.C. players
VCD Athletic F.C. players
Premier League players
English Football League players
National League (English football) players
Isthmian League players